James H. Morrissey (born May 10, 1930) is an American politician who served as a Republican Assemblyman from California's 69th State Assembly district from 1994 to 1998.

Military service and family

Born May 10, 1930 in New Rochelle, New York. His family moved to Tucson, Arizona in 1943. Morrissey joined the Air Force in 1947 where he served for three years. He later joined the Army Reserve.

In 1956, Jim and his young family moved to Los Angeles, California. Since 1960, he has been a resident of Orange County and has been a resident of Anaheim since 1978. Jim and his wife (Margaret) have six children and fourteen grandchildren.

Small Businessman
Morrissey's first occupation was tool and die manufacturing. Later, he moved into management where he became the president of Superior Jig, Inc., a producer of precision aerospace parts.

Political career
Morrissey got into politics several years ago after his wife saw him yelling at a politician on the TV screen and suggested he stop complaining and try to make a change. The couple volunteered their time for Republican Party. Jim founded the Irish Republican Club and the Republican Small Business Association. Jim Morrissey served on the executive board of the Republican Central Committee of Orange County.

In 1995, the Legislature passed a Morrissey resolution calling for the release of Jimmy Tran, an American citizen being held as a political prisoner in Vietnam.  Jim later traveled to Vietnam at his own expense to try and win Tran's political freedom and that of nine other Vietnamese Americans. Morrissey said though the trip did not achieve its ultimate goal, but it brought attention to the cases of the Vietnamese-American prisoners.

References

External links
Join California Jim Morrissey

1930 births
Republican Party members of the California State Assembly
Politicians from New Rochelle, New York
Living people
Businesspeople from New Rochelle, New York
20th-century American politicians